The Borough School, also known as Stonington High School from 1910 to 1939, is a condominium building at 25 Orchard Street in Stonington, Connecticut.  It was built in 1888 and is a distinct and high quality local example of Second Empire architecture.  The building was listed on the National Register of Historic Places in 1978 and was converted to residential use in 1981. This building is not to be confused with the town's Stonington High School in Pawcatuck.

Description and history
The school is located on the east side of Stonington Neck, its back side overlooking Little Narragansett Bay east of the commercial center of Stonington village.  It is a -story brick Second Empire structure, with a mansard roof and a four-story tower above its entrance.  The tower is also topped by a mansard roof, with iron cresting at the top.  The main roof is pierced by dormers with pedimented gables, and the tower's roof faces are pierced by dormers with round-arch windows.  Windows are set in pairs in segmented-arch openings or singly in round-arch openings, with stone keystones and lintel end stones.  The interior is framed in wood.

The school was built in 1888, and originally served as a community school for the village, housing all grade levels.  It was doubled in size in 1903, with a near duplicate of the original construction placed to the rear and joined to it via a connecting hall and stairwell.  A new high school was built in 1939, at which time this school was reduced to use as an elementary school.  It was closed due to fire in 1973.

See also
National Register of Historic Places listings in New London County, Connecticut

References

School buildings on the National Register of Historic Places in Connecticut
Second Empire architecture in Connecticut
School buildings completed in 1888
Stonington, Connecticut
Schools in New London County, Connecticut
National Register of Historic Places in New London County, Connecticut